Aurélien Bélanger (March 18, 1878 – February 12, 1953) was an Ontario political figure. He represented Russell in the Legislative Assembly of Ontario as a Liberal and Independent Liberal from 1923 to 1929 and Prescott as a Liberal from 1934 to 1948.

He was born in Sainte-Scholastique, Quebec in 1878, the son of Zotique Belanger, and studied at the Université Laval. Bélanger was a professor at the University of Ottawa, school inspector for Russell County, director of bilingual schools for the city of Ottawa and president of the Saint-Jean-Baptiste Society of Ottawa. He married Alida, the daughter of Télesphore Rochon. Bélanger was one of the founders of the newspaper Le Droit in 1912. He was defeated by Charles Avila Séguin for the Russell seat in 1929. He died at Ottawa in 1953.

References

Further reading

External links 

1878 births
1953 deaths
Franco-Ontarian people
Ontario Liberal Party MPPs
Université Laval alumni
School inspectors